Ray Ries (1894–1977) was an American cinematographer active during the silent era. He was employed by independent studio Action Pictures on a number of westerns, frequently collaborating with director Richard Thorpe.

Selected filmography

 Thundering Romance (1924)
 Fast Fightin' (1925)
 Reckless Courage (1925)
 On the Go (1925)
 Double Action Daniels (1925)
 The Desert Demon (1925)
 The Saddle Cyclone (1925)
 Galloping On (1925)
 The Bonanza Buckaroo (1926)
 Ace of Action (1926)
 The Ramblin' Galoot (1926)
 Twisted Triggers (1926)
 The Interferin' Gent (1927)
 The Obligin' Buckaroo (1927)
 White Pebbles (1927)
 The Soda Water Cowboy (1927)
 The Meddlin' Stranger (1927)
 The Fightin' Comeback (1927)
 The Cyclone Cowboy (1927) 
 The Desert of the Lost (1927)
 Ride 'em High (1927)
 Code of the Cow Country (1927)
 Roarin' Broncs (1927)
 Skedaddle Gold (1927)
 The Galloping Gobs (1927)
 Pals in Peril (1927)
 Tearin' Into Trouble (1927)
 The Ridin' Rowdy (1927)
 Saddle Mates (1928)
 Desperate Courage (1928)
 The Flyin' Buckaroo (1928)
 The Ballyhoo Buster (1928)
 The Valley of Hunted Men (1928)
 The Cowboy Cavalier (1928)
 The King of the Kongo (1929)
 Dark Skies (1929)

References

Bibliography
 Munden, Kenneth White. The American Film Institute Catalog of Motion Pictures Produced in the United States, Part 1. University of California Press, 1997.

External links

1894 births
1967 deaths
American cinematographers
People from Ohio